Kristen Hawkes is an American anthropologist, currently a professor at University of Utah. In 2021 she was elected to the American Philosophical Society.

Education 

Hawkes received a bachelor's degree

Research 
Hawkes, an expert in human evolution and sociobiology, is the author of several studies on the “grandmother hypothesis,” which asserts that many of the characteristics that distinguish us from our ape ancestors are thanks to the thoughtful care of our mothers' mothers.
Her research is based on ethnographic observation studies of hunter-gatherer communities such as the Aché and Hadza.
She has also developed mathematical models to model evolution over time and trace the influence of grandmothers on human lifespan. 
Combining mathematical modelling and observational studies she also researches the effects of fire on ancient hunter-gatherers.

See also 

 Grandmother hypothesis

References

Year of birth missing (living people)
Living people
University of Utah faculty
American anthropologists
Members of the United States National Academy of Sciences
Members of the American Philosophical Society
Behavioral ecology